Heartbreak Town is the debut studio album of American country music artist Steve Azar. Released on River North Records in 1996, it features the singles "Someday" and "I Never Stopped Loving You" that peaked at numbers 51 and 50, respectively, on the Billboard Hot Country Singles & Tracks (now Hot Country Songs) charts that year. Azar did not release another album until Waitin' on Joe six years later. The track "I Go Crazy" is a cover of Paul Davis' hit single from 1978.

Critical reception
Country Standard Time critic Larry Stephens gave a mostly-negative review, saying that outside "Thunderbird" and "As Long as Harley Gets to Play," the album's songs were too similar to each other in sound and "not strong enough to carry [their] weight on radio." Billboard was more positive, with an uncredited review calling Azar's songwriting "adept", while comparing his voice favorably to John Mellencamp.

Track listing
"I Never Stopped Lovin' You" (Steve Azar, Jason Blume) – 4:10
"Nights Like This" (Azar, Bob Regan) – 3:32
"What Are We Waitin' For" (Azar, Roger Murrah, A. J. Masters) – 2:43
"Someday" (Azar, Masters, Regan) – 3:06
"Thunderbird" (Azar, Masters, Tommy Rocco) – 4:54
"As Long as Harley Gets to Play" (Azar, Masters, Murrah) – 3:50
"Dreams of a Dancer" (Azar, Masters, Regan) – 3:11
"Heartbreak Town" (Azar, Murrah, Regan) – 3:08
"I Go Crazy" (Paul Davis) – 3:51
"Caught Between the Rock and the Roll" (Azar, Masters, Don Goodman) – 4:15
"Love Had No Right" (Azar, Masters, Tony Marty) – 3:20
"You Don't Even Have to Try" (Azar, Masters, Murrah) – 3:03

Personnel
As listed in liner notes.
Steve Azar – lead vocals, background vocals, acoustic guitar
Eddie Bayers – drums
Michael Black – background vocals
Kathy Burdick – background vocals
Glen Duncan – acoustic guitar
Larry Franklin – fiddle
Sonny Garrish – pedal steel guitar
Greg Leisz –  electric guitar, lap steel guitar, pedal steel guitar
Brent Mason – electric guitar
A. J. Masters – acoustic guitar, bass guitar, background vocals
Matthew Morse – strings
Steve Nathan – piano, Hammond B-3 organ
Johnny Neel – piano
Russ Pahl – pedal steel guitar
Gary Pigg – background vocals
Bob Regan – electric guitar
Michael Rhodes – bass guitar
Brent Rowan – acoustic guitar, electric guitar
John Wesley Ryles – background vocals
Joe Thomas – acoustic guitar, piano
Jonathan Yudkin – fiddle

References

1996 debut albums
Steve Azar albums
River North Records albums